The sixteenth Connecticut House of Representatives district elects one member of the Connecticut House of Representatives. Its current representative is John Hampton, who held the seat for the Democratic Party in 2012 after the retirement of three-term representative Linda Schofield with a reduced majority. The district consists of the entire town of Simsbury.

List of representatives

Recent elections

References

External links 
 Google Maps - Connecticut House Districts

16
Simsbury, Connecticut